Uno is an unincorporated community in northwestern Turtle Creek Township in Shelby County, in the U.S. state of Ohio.

History
A post office called Uno was established in 1876, and remained in operation until 1904. In 1913, Uno had about 22 inhabitants.

References

Unincorporated communities in Shelby County, Ohio
Unincorporated communities in Ohio